Carol Woods (born November 13, 1943) is an American actress and singer. She is best known for her roles in Sweet and Lowdown (1999), The Honeymooners (2005) and Across the Universe (2007). In February 2008, she received a standing ovation during the 50th Grammy Awards broadcast singing "Let It Be" from the Across the Universe soundtrack, with Timothy Mitchum.

Inspired by Barack Obama's campaign and win, Woods recorded Grammy Award winner Julie Gold's song "America". The CD of America (The Song) made its debut in a Limited Inaugural Edition at the "Shades of Blue" Inaugural Gala, hosted by Create the Vision Source in Washington D.C. January 20, 2009. In July 2009, America became available to the public at large.

In early 2009, she reprised the role of Matron "Mama" Morton in Chicago on Broadway, followed by two weeks at the National Theatre (March 31 – April 12, 2009). She remained on tour with the show through June 2010, returning to the Broadway production in July. She is also recording material for a new CD titled Blues in the Night.

Career

Theater 
Carol Woods  Broadway theatre credits include Matron Mama Morton in Chicago, Stella Deems in the Roundabout Theater's 2001 revival of Stephen Sondheim's Follies, Mrs Crosby in Neal Simon's The Goodbye Girl (1993), and Maybelle in Grind in 1985. She also made a special guest appearance in the 2002 One Mo Time revival as Ma Reed. She was nominated for an Olivier Award for her role in the 1987 London production of Blues in the Night, which led to a NYC run at the Minetta Lane Theater, and in 2008 reprised  the role in  a San Francisco Production. As a founding member of Tony Randall's National Actors Theatre, in 1992, Carol appeared in their first two productions A Little Hotel on  the Side and as Tituba in The Crucible. She left Big River in 1987 to play Rose in the Tommy Tune-directed Stepping Out (play).On Tour  she recreated the role of Jeanette Burmeister in The Full Monty.

Off-Broadway, she is best known for her portrayal of Big Bertha in The Village Gate's 1979 production of One Mo' Time and its TV commercial where she sang part of You've Got The Right Key But You're Working On The Wrong Keyhole and viewers were invited to see the rest in person.  In 1993, she portrayed Lorena Hickok in First Lady Suite at The Public Theater.  In 1997 at the Samuel Beckett Theater she appeared as Vy, Aladdin's mother in Dreamstuff a contemporary musical spin on Aladdin.

Her regional theater credits include An Evening Dinner Theatre in Elmsford, New York where she appeared as Jewel in The Best Little Whorehouse in Texas.  At the McCarter Theater in Princeton, New Jersey, Carol Woods appeared in C'mon and Hear: Irving Berlin's America (1994), A Christmas Carol (1996), Greensboro: A Requiem (1996).  At Montclair State University in 1992 Carol Woods repeated the starring role in Ma Rainey's Black Bottom, which she had played in London's Royal National Theatre three years earlier.  During Theaterfest '94 she appeared in Side by Side by Sondheim, and during TheatreFest '98, Triplets: The Diva Musical with Ruth Brown, and Angela Robinson.  For the Williamstown Theatre Festival she appeared in Hot l Baltimore (2000).

Film 
Her first film credit was as the infamous Aunt Bunny in Eddie Murphy Raw (1987). She reprised her stage role of Rose in Stepping Out, based on the play of the same name, with Liza Minnelli, Shelley Winters, Bill Irwin and Jane Krakowski. Rose's son in the film was played by Carol's real son Raymond Rickman. She performed at both the Toronto Benefit for Starlight during the filming and at the "Broadway Cares/Equity Fights AIDS" New York Premiere of the film.

In Sweet and Lowdown (1999), as Helen Minton, she sings All Of Me. In The Honeymooners (2005) she plays Alice's Mom. She also appears in Across the Universe (2007).

Having been directed by Jack Wrangler in cabaret, she appears as herself in the 2008 documentary Wrangler: Anatomy of an Icon. Woods is also featured in Steam as Ella, with Ruby Dee, and in When the Evening Comes (2009) (as Mrs. Anderson).

Television 
 The Parent 'Hood (Season 1)
 Law & Order
 Third Watch
 The Practice episode – Neighboring Species
 The Big C episode – Divine Intervention
The Good Wife Season 4, Episode 14, Red Team/Blue Team

Recordings 
 Bosom Buddies – with Karen Saunders
 Lost in the Stars
 Breakfast at Tiffany's
 Barcelona – While appearing in the London production of Blues in the Night, Carol befriended Freddie Mercury, who asked her to sing backup on his album
 Lead vocal on the song "Brighter Tomorrow" from trumpeter Tom Browne from his album Rockin' Radio

Three CDs in The Riverwalk Series: New Year's All Star Jam, American Love Songs and Hot Jazz For A Cool Yule. She also appears on the Cast Albums of Grind, The Goodbye Girl and Blues In The Night.

Concerts and cabaret 
The Village Gate
Songs in the Key of Stevie reunited her with Ron Richardson
The Stevie Wonder tribute was directed by Obba Babatundé
New Year's Eve Party with opening act Dianna Jones
Featured vocalist at Late Night Swing Shows
During One Mo' Time made frequent "guest" appearances in the Terrace Bar Cabaret 
She continued this practice when she dropped in to see other performers, notably Emmy Kemp, until "The Gate"  closed.

Carnegie Hall
An Evening with Carol Woods November 27, 2000 
Benefit concerts for the Lauri Strauss Leukemia Foundation honoring Johnny Mercer (2001), Kander and Ebb (2003), and Marvin Hamlisch (2006).

92nd Street Y
Various Lyrics and Lyricists shows

Downtime
Her CD Bosom Buddies was recorded there live

Arci's Place 
Stick Around ran from  January 30 through February 24, 2001

Rainbow and Stars
S Wonderful, 'S Marvelous, 'S Gershwin'' (1992) with Jo Anne WorleyMichael's PubTribute shows to Sammy Davis, Jr. and Pearl Bailey (1991)Freddy's Supper Club  June 1985Nell'sB. SmithsIridium'''

External links 

Official site

Carol Woods at Internet Off-Broadway Database

Living people
African-American actresses
20th-century African-American women singers
American musical theatre actresses
1943 births
21st-century African-American people
21st-century African-American women